We Will Be Dead Tomorrow is the second album by UK sludgecore band Raging Speedhorn.

Track listing
"The Hate Song"
"Scrapin' The Resin"
"Me and You Man"
"Scaramanga"
"Chronic Youth"
"Iron Cobra"
"Heartbreaker"
"Fuck the Voodooman"
"Spitting Blood"
"Welcome to Shitsville"
"Ride With the Devil"
Bonus track (Japanese edition)
"My War" (Black Flag cover)

References

2002 albums
Raging Speedhorn albums
ZTT Records albums